Roman Aleksandrovich Lisovsky (born 22 November 2001) is a Belarusian professional footballer who plays for Vitebsk.

References

External links 
 
 

2001 births
Living people
Belarusian footballers
Association football midfielders
FC BATE Borisov players
FC Isloch Minsk Raion players
FC Vitebsk players